Rimavské Zalužany is a village and municipality in the Rimavská Sobota District of the Banská Bystrica Region of southern Slovakia. In the village are public library, kindergarten, train stop, foodstuff store and a pub. The most important sightseeing is neogothic belfry from the half of 19th century.

References

External links
 
 
Rimavské Zalužany news at www.sme.sk

Villages and municipalities in Rimavská Sobota District